Chitranna (also known as lemon-rice) is a rice-based dish widely prepared in South India. It is prepared by mixing cooked rice with a special seasoning called Oggarane or Gojju. Characteristic for the seasoning are mustard seeds, fried lentils, peanuts, curry leaves, chillies, lemon juice and other optional items such as  scrapes of unripe mango. Added Turmeric powder gives Chitranna its yellow color. Garlic and onions are also used in the seasoning by some, although traditionally they do not form part of the recipe.
The dish is especially popular in the south Indian state of Karnataka, where it has become a part of the daily diet.

History
Chitranna rice dish finds mention in medieval Indian cookbooks Manasollasa (1130 AD) and Pakadarpana (1200 AD) as "Chitrapaka".

Varieties
Depending on the ingredients, various types of Chitranna can be prepared:
 Nimbehannu Chitranna : This is the famous 'Lemon Rice' prepared by mixing cooked rice with turmeric and lemon juice

 Eerulli Chitranna : Onion Chitranna; Fried onion, mustard seeds, split chickpeas and green chillies are mixed with cooked rice
 Mavinakayi Chitranna : Mango Chitranna; Raw, unripe mango is ground into a paste and mixed with cooked rice
 Kayi-Sasive Chitranna : Grated coconut and mustard seeds are ground into a paste and mixed with cooked rice
 Heralekayi Chitranna : This is made by using Citron Lime and Rice.

References

Karnataka cuisine
Indian rice dishes